Expiration Date is a time travel crime novel by Duane Swierczynski published in 2010. It was  published by Minotaur Books, an imprint of St. Martin's Press owned by Macmillan Publishers. The novel received the Anthony Award for Best Paperback Original in 2011.

Plot summary
When Mickey Wade loses his newspaper job he returns to his old slum neighborhood in Philadelphia to stay in his grandfather's flat. He takes some "headache" pills only to find that they send him into the past – to 1972, the year he was born. There he meets the 12-year-old who will grow up to murder Mickey's father.

References 

2010 American novels
2010 science fiction novels
American science fiction novels
American crime novels
Novels about time travel
Novels set in Philadelphia
Fiction set in 1972
Anthony Award-winning works
Minotaur Books books